Genshin Impact is an action role-playing game developed and published by miHoYo. It was released for Android, iOS, PlayStation 4, and Windows in 2020, on PlayStation 5 in 2021, and is set for release on Nintendo Switch. The game features an  anime-style open-world environment and an action-based battle system using elemental magic and character-switching. The game is free-to-play and is monetized through gacha game mechanics through which players can obtain new characters and weapons. The base game is expanded regularly through patches using the games as a service model.

Genshin Impact takes place in the fantasy world of Teyvat, home to seven nations, each of which is tied to a different element and ruled by a different god. The story follows the Traveler, who has traveled across countless worlds with their twin sibling before becoming separated in Teyvat. The Traveler travels in search of the lost sibling with their companion Paimon and becomes involved in the affairs of Teyvat's nations.

Development of Genshin Impact began in 2017. The game generally received positive reviews, with critics praising its combat mechanics and the immersive open world but criticizing its simplistic endgame and monetization model.

Gameplay 

Genshin Impact is an open-world, action role-playing game that allows the player to control one of four interchangeable characters in a party. Switching between characters can be done quickly during combat, allowing the player to use several different combinations of skills and attacks. Characters may have their strengths enhanced in various ways, such as increasing a character's level and improving artifacts and the weapons that the character equips. In addition to exploration, the player can attempt various challenges for rewards. Scattered across Teyvat are bosses and challenges that reward highly valuable resources, such as Stormterror and the Electro Hypostasis, but claiming them uses up a currency called resin, which slowly regenerates over time. Completing these challenges grants the player progress towards increasing their Adventure Rank, which in turn unlocks new quests, challenges, and raises the World Level. The World Level is a measure of how strong the enemies within the world are and the rarity of rewards that defeating them gives.

The player can control their character and perform actions such as running, climbing, swimming, and gliding, limited by stamina. Some characters possess abilities that can alter the environment, such as freezing water, to create an ice path that can aid the player in traversing terrain. Many teleportation nodes exist throughout the world that players can warp to as a form of fast travel; among these are landmarks known as Statues of The Seven that can heal and revive characters, and provide benefits such as increasing player stamina. Items such as food and ore may be procured from the open world, while enemies and treasure chests drop other types of resources that may be used in enhancing a character's strength. Players can obtain food from hunting animals, gathering fruit and vegetables, or purchasing them from a store. Furthermore, there are special battle instances called Domains that reward materials that increase character and weapon strength. Ingredients that can be cooked into meals that regenerate characters' health or boost various stats. Players can also procure ore that can be refined and then used to create weapons or enhance their strength.

Each character has two unique combat skills: an Elemental Skill and an Elemental Burst. The Elemental Skill can be used at any time except for the cooldown period immediately after use. In contrast, the Elemental Burst has an energy cost, requiring the user to amass sufficient elemental energy by defeating enemies or inflicting elemental status effects. Characters have control over one of seven natural elements: Cryo, Dendro, Pyro, Hydro, Anemo, Electro and Geo; which correspond to ice, plants, fire, water, wind, electricity, and rock, respectively. These elements can interact in different ways; for example, if a Hydro attack hits a target, the enemy will be inflicted with the "Wet" status effect, and if they are hit with a Cryo attack, it will inflict "Cryo". These two status effects combine into the "Frozen" status effect, temporarily preventing the target from performing any actions or until the player deals enough physical damage to the enemy. Switching between characters during combat and executing those skills allows those elemental interactions to take place. Certain elemental abilities may be required to solve puzzles within the overworld.

A multiplayer mode is available in the form of co-op. Up to 4 players can play together in the overworld and join Domains. Player matching can either be done by requesting to connect with another player. If the player wishes to clear a Domain with other players, they will be automatically matched up with others looking to tackle the same objective. The game features cross-platform play, so players on any platform can play with each other.

By completing quests to advance the story, the player can initially unlock four additional playable characters, and more characters can be obtained via a gacha mechanic and in-game events. Several premium in-game currencies, obtainable through in-app purchases and playing the game, can be used to obtain characters and weapons through the gacha system. A pity system guarantees that the player will receive rare items after a set number of draws.

Genius Invokation TCG
A tabletop collectible card game called "Genius Invokation TCG" was released in game's version 3.3 as a minigame. The game uses turn-based battles. Players need to build a deck with a combination of 3 character cards and 30 action cards, and win by knocking down all the opponent's character cards. Each round need to throw 8 Elemental dice to turn action phase, which can be used to switch character cards, action cards, character cards to attack, etc. The gameplay has also been added to the game. The elemental reaction can provide additional damage, limit the actions of opponent characters and other effects. Players in Genshin Impact will get a prop to mark the player characters on the map that can be played against, or invite players to fight in Mondstadt's Cat's Tail tavern. Defeating opponents can get certain rewards, which can be used to unlock new cards. After the player's card level reaches 4, they can invite and play against other players via co-op mode.

Within the fiction, Genius Invokation TCG is a popular card game developed by the scholars in Sumeru. In order to promote the game, scholars commissioned the traveling merchant named Liben, to bring the prototype of the card game to Yae Publishing House in Inazuma, and commissioned by the novelist Fukumoto, to create the light novel called This novel is Amazing for publicity.

Story

Setting and characters 

Genshin Impact takes place in the world of Teyvat, composed of the seven major nations of Mondstadt, Liyue, Inazuma, Sumeru, Fontaine, Natlan, and Snezhnaya; each nation is ruled by a different god. The mysterious floating island of Celestia is allegedly home to gods and mortals who have ascended to godhood through great, heroic feats. Underground lie the ruins of the nation of Khaenri'ah which was destroyed by gods 500 years before the events of the game. Unlike the seven major nations, Khaenri'ah was not ruled over by a god. The player character, the Traveler (male or female, depending on the player's choice), is separated from their twin and becomes trapped in Teyvat. They are joined by a companion, Paimon, as they journey through Teyvat in search of their lost sibling. Although players can choose the name they want to be referred by, the Traveler's sibling refers to the Traveler by either Aether or Lumine if the Traveler is male or female, respectively.

Each nation is associated with and worships one of The Seven, a group of gods known as the "Archons", who each preside over one of the seven nations. Each member of The Seven is tied to one of the game's elements, and is also reflected in their nation's aspect. Barbatos, Rex Lapis, the Raiden Shogun, Kusanali, Focalors, and the Tsaritsa are the Archons of Mondstadt, Liyue, Inazuma, Sumeru, Fontaine, and Snezhnaya, respectively. However, the god who is the Archon may change over time as Archons pass away. If a person's ambitions are great enough, they may be granted a Vision—magical gemstones that give their bearers the ability to command an element and the potential to ascend to godhood and reside in Celestia.

Mondstadt, the city of freedom, worships the Anemo Archon Barbatos and sits on an island in the middle of a lake. The city is protected by the Knights of Favonius, who are tasked with protecting Mondstadt and its citizens. To the southwest, Liyue worships the Geo Archon Rex Lapis (also known as Morax) and is the largest market harbor in Teyvat. The harbor city is presided over by the Liyue Qixing, a group of business leaders. There are also ancient guardians known as Adepti, a class of magical beings that includes Rex Lapis himself. East of Liyue lies Sumeru, an nation composed of both rain-forests and desert. Nominally ruled over by the Dendro Archon, Lesser Lord Kusanali, Sumeru is largely controlled by the powerful Akademiya, which is one of Teyvat's most prestigious research institutes. However, instead of celebrating their current god, the sages who lead the Akademiya focus much of their attention on venerating the former Dendro Archon, Greater Lord Rukkhadevata.

Across the sea to the southeast lies the isolationist island nation of Inazuma, overseen by the authoritarian regime of the Raiden Shogun (also known as Baal) and three governmental bodies that together make up the Tri-Commission: the Tenryou Commission, Kanjou Commission, and Yashiro Commission; overseeing military and executive affairs, finances and foreign affairs, and ceremonial affairs respectively. Snezhnaya, ruled by the Cryo Archon known as the Tsaritsa, sends out diplomats called the Fatui, who maintain a friendly appearance while using more underhanded methods secretly. The Fatui are also led by the Eleven Fatui Harbingers, individuals given extraordinary powers and executive authority by the Tsaritsa. In addition to the Fatui, another major antagonistic faction in the game is the Abyss Order, a legion of monsters that declares themselves to be enemies to all of humanity and the nations of Teyvat. They are led by the "Prince" or "Princess", the lost twin of the Traveler.

Each nation takes inspiration from real-life nations and cultures: "Mondstadt" is German for "moon city", and takes inspiration from medieval Central Europe (especially Germany); Liyue (Jade Moon) is based on China; Inazuma (lightning) is based on Edo Japan; Sumeru, named after Mount Meru, takes inspiration from North Africa, West and South Asia; Fontaine, (French for "Fountain") is based on France; Natlan is based on Indigenous America, Latin America and West African Cultures; and Snezhnaya (snowy) takes inspiration from Russia.

Plot

A pair of twins who travel across different worlds arrive in the world of Teyvat. As they attempt to leave it, their path is blocked off by a god who claims herself as the "Sustainer of Heavenly Principles", and separates them away from each other. One of the twins, referred to as the "Traveler", awakens and find themselves stranded and their powers sealed. Two months later, the Traveler meets Paimon, who proposes to aid and guide the them throughout the seven nations of Teyvat to search for the other twin. Paimon suggests that they consult with each nation's ruling archons, deities of elemental power, for assistance.

They first arrive to the nation of Mondstadt, whose archon Barbatos is the God of Anemo. Upon arriving at the city of Mondstadt, they find that the city is being terrorized by a dragon called Stormterror. With the help of a bard named Venti, they realized that the dragon is being manipulated by the Abyss Order, a legion of mysterious creatures wreaking havoc throughout Teyvat. Venti reveals himself to be a manifestation of Barbatos and frees the dragon of its influence, informing it of his desire for all of Mondstadt to enjoy all freedom. After solving the crisis, they are ambushed by La Signora, a Fatui Harbinger diplomat from nation of Snezhnaya, who steals Venti's Gnosis (a symbol of an Archon's power) in the name of her archon, the Tsaritsa. Upon recovering, Venti has no answers to give about the Traveler's twin but advises them to visit the neighboring nation of Liyue to meet Rex Lapis, a manifestation of Morax, the Geo Archon.

The Traveler and Paimon go to Liyue Harbor to visit Rex Lapis, only for him to descend lifeless from the skies. They are assisted by the mortician Zhongli and the Fatui Harbinger Childe, in performing a rite of farewell for the archon. Childe's ulterior motive—to find Rex Lapis's body and steal his Gnosis, is intercepted by the Traveler. To retaliate, Childe unleashes an ancient fallen god to terrorize the nation. Its inhabitants, the adepti and humans join forces to successfully defend Liyue. The Traveler and Childe later find out that Zhongli is the true vessel for Morax and has already exchanged his Gnosis with La Signora in an undisclosed contract. Zhongli retires as the ruling archon of Liyue, assuring the Traveler that the nation will be safe in the hands of the Qixing and Adepti. When the Traveler asks about their twin, Zhongli states that he has knowledge, but due to a contract, he cannot divulge any details.

The Traveler and Paimon return to Mondstadt and meets a stranger named Dainsleif, who assists them in investigating an insidious attempt of the Abyss Order to artificially create a deity capable of overthrowing the sky-hovering realm of Celestia, which rules all over Teyvat. In their journey, Dainsleif divulges information about the fallen kingdom of Khaenri'ah and its connection to the Abyss Order. Their success in thwarting the attempt is interrupted by the arrival of Traveler's sibling, who refuses to reunite with the Traveler and is revealed as the leader of the Abyss Order. Dainsleif chases after them, leaving the Traveler to decide to continue on their original mission.

The Traveler and Paimon are informed that the island nation of Inazuma is under an isolationist border policy and that the visions of some of its inhabitants are being confiscated by order of the Raiden Shogun, the vessel of the Electro Archon Baal. They stealthily arrive at the nation via boat, hoping for an audience with her, but their interruption of the Shogun's vision confiscation invokes her wrath instead. Barely escaping, they joins the insurgents and learns that the harmful decrees have been devised by the Fatui. Powerless in confronting the Fatui Harbinger No. 6, going by the name of Scaramouche, the Traveler is saved by the Raiden Shogun's shrine maiden Yae Miko, who trades in the Electro Archon's Gnosis for ransom. Miko devises a plan for the Traveler to confront the Raiden Shogun and her real master—Ei, the vessel of Baal's twin sister Beelzebul (Makoto). Ei reveals that she and Makoto once ruled Inazuma together as one before the latter's death. Grieving for her loss, she secluded herself and her country to preserve her ideals of eternity. Conceding defeat, she abolishes the Vision Hunt Decree and begins to reconsider her understanding of an eternal nation. Despite their victories, Miko is unable to provide useful information to the Traveler about their sibling, but suggests to visit the Dendro Archon, Lesser Lord Kusanali.

The Traveler and Paimon returns to Liyue to explore the Chasm region and reunites with Dainsleif, who is unsuccessful in chasing after their sibling. Seeing a vision of their sibling attempting to revive the kingdom of Khaenri'ah, they are torn between helping their sibling and defeating the Abyss Order. Dainsleif declares that the Traveler must choose between the world of Teyvat or their twin before departing.

The Traveler and Paimon journey to Sumeru in search of Lesser Lord Kusanali, but are unable to due to the Akademiya trapping her in her home and actively suppressing information about Kusanali. The Traveler is able to meet her vessel, Nahida, within a dream, and discover that the Akademiya's sages, in partnership with the Fatui Harbinger Il Dottore, are trying to replace Kusanali by turning Scaramouche into a god with the power of the Electro Gnosis. After the Traveler and Nahida fight Scaramouche and subdue him, Nahida seizes the Electro Gnosis and uses its power to visit the last memory of Rukkhadevata, who reveals that she created Kusanali as a means to erase herself from the world's collective memory to erase the spread of knowledge that had polluted the world. Upon doing so, everyone forgets about Rukkadevata except the Traveler, who is unaffected due to not being from Teyvat. Il Dottore later blacks the Traveler and Paimon out, to force Nahida to give up the Electro and Dendro Gnoses. She gives up the Electro Gnosis in exchange for Il Dottre to remove all copies of himself from reality. Days later, before the Traveler heads for Fontaine, Nahida tells them that they are the fourth of the "Descenders", the Fatui's label for those who come from outside Teyvat, but their sibling is not counted among them.

Development 
Genshin Impact began development as early as late January 2017, with an initial team of 120 people, which grew to 400 by the end of that year, and reached 700 by February 2021. miHoYo revealed the game in June 2019 at E3 2019. The game was developed using the Unity Engine. Between the announcement and release closed beta tests were held, allowing invited players to explore and interact with the open world. The game includes voice-overs in four languages, and 15 different languages for text.

The Legend of Zelda: Breath of the Wild is held in high regard by the development team, and is cited as one of the main inspirations for Genshin Impact. Development was aimed at making the game different and fun from other MMORPGs in terms of its quest and combat systems as well as its random events and mode of exploration. The game was designed to be cross-platform as developing the game for PC and console allowed the developers to raise graphical fidelity for the game, such as rendering realistic shadows. The overall artistic vision of the game is intended to combine anime art style with more key elements from real-world cultures. For example, Liyue was first conceived of as a reimagining of Chinese culture through a fantasy perspective, and was combined with reference material from Zhangjiajie National Forest Park and Tianmen Mountain to create the region.

Music

Yu-Peng Chen of HOYO-MiX composed the game's original score, which was performed by the London Philharmonic Orchestra, the Shanghai Symphony Orchestra, and the Tokyo Philharmonic Orchestra. The approach to creating the soundtrack is to immerse players within the game, and provide emotional and beautiful melodies. Based upon a foundation of Western music, the score also has regional and cultural influences added depending upon the region. For example, in Mondstadt, Chen used woodwind instruments to reflect Mondstadt's association with wind and freedom. In contrast, the battle themes use polyphony and other composing techniques, as well as mimicking orchestration elements from composers such as Beethoven. Several soundtrack albums featuring music about characters and regions of the game have been released periodically. For his work on the soundtrack Chen was awarded the "Outstanding Artist—Newcomer/Breakthrough" at the 2020 Annual Game Music Awards. In an interview published in April 2021 Chen expressed interest in releasing the soundtracks on CD, as well as hosting concerts in the future. The first concert was held virtually on October 3, 2021, titled "Melodies of an Endless Journey" and featured multiple bands and an orchestra performing various soundtracks from the game. A second virtual concert was held on February 4, 2022, titled "Reflections of Spring" featuring the Shanghai Symphony Orchestra performing soundtracks from the Liyue region.

Release 
The worldwide release, September 28 2020, was announced on August 17 for PC and mobile platforms, and on August 28, it was revealed that the PlayStation 4 version was released on the same date. The game was made available on PlayStation 5 through backwards compatibility on November 11. On April 28, 2021, the PlayStation 5 version of the game was released, featuring enhanced visuals, improved loading times, and DualSense controller support. A Nintendo Switch version is in development, though no release window has been announced.

Prior to its release the game had over 10 million registrations, with over half of that from outside China. According to some, the game was the biggest international release of any Chinese video game. In the lead up to release, the game won the Tokyo Game Show Media Awards 2020 public poll, ranking first among 14 other games.

Updates 
Shortly after the game's launch, miHoYo announced a schedule for content updates over the following months. As a long-term project, much of the game remains to be finished. On release, only two of the seven major regions intended for the game were released, and miHoYo anticipates it will take several years for the game's story to be completed.

Updates are implemented into the game every six weeks and add more characters, events and new areas of Teyvat. Major updates ("Versions"), adding new major regions, are implemented annually. As of version 3.4 (January 2023), three major versions with a total of 19 updates have been released.

Other media 
Prior to the release of the game, miHoYo released a manga on their websites detailing the background of its characters and the fictional world of Teyvat. It is translated into various different languages though only 13 of its 16 chapters were officially released in western languages. Various other short comics are also released on Genshin Impact's official Twitter accounts.

Animated videos teasing its story and characters are released on Genshin Impact's official YouTube channels.

In September 2022, miHoYo announced a partnership with Japanese animation studio Ufotable to develop an anime adaption based on the game, accompanied by a concept trailer.

Other future plans include a line of comics, toys, and a possible movie.

Controversies
When the game was first unveiled at the ChinaJoy convention in 2019, it was immediately and initially met with criticisms claiming that the game had similarities to Breath of the Wild. Zelda fans at the convention showed explicit gestures towards the Sony booth, with one individual destroying their PlayStation 4 console in protest.

Shortly after release, players discovered that the game's kernel-based anti-cheat system would remain active after the game was closed or uninstalled, which raised concerns that the game had installed spyware. Some Japanese players using iOS devices also observed that the game read the contents of players' clipboards while starting up. miHoYo announced that both issues were the result of coding errors and have been addressed and fixed.

On October 6, 2020, journalist and Twitch streamer Kazuma Hashimoto published a video on social media site Twitter demonstrating how political terms controversial in China such as "Hong Kong" and "Taiwan" are censored within the in-game chat. As the developer of the game, miHoYo, is based in China, they are subject to China's censorship policy, which includes complying with a relatively large list of banned words that cannot be used in game or via chat. Other terms not related to Chinese politics are banned as well, such as "Putin", "Hitler", and "Stalin". Extending outside of purely political wordage, innocuous terms such as "enemies" and "words" were also being censored.

In November 2020, the game was met with controversy during a character's release, Zhongli, due to his equipment and gameplay being viewed as poor to the point where it was taken as an insult toward Chinese players. miHoYo published a blog post in response, noting that the character was working as designed. Later, miHoYo issued an apology, and promised to improve the character's kit during beta testing for version 1.3.

In March 2021, fast food company KFC announced a collaboration event in China that offered exclusive pins and in-game items to customers who turned up and shouted the phrase "Meet in another world, enjoy delicious food!" at the restaurant's employees. As a result, KFC outlets in Shanghai, Nanjing, and Hangzhou were overrun with fans. Despite authorities' best efforts to maintain COVID-19 regulations, the promotion was forced to shut down.

In April 2021, some called for a boycott of the game over claims of bigotry in the game's content. Some other users pointed out how the only playable characters with dark skin were described as "exotic" or "scary" in the game. Criticism was also aimed at one of the game's adult characters expressing love towards another character that appears to be a child, though this may have been an oversight as the character in question was noted to have used an adult model during earlier stages of development.

In September 2021, players criticized the lackluster in-game rewards for the first anniversary event run by miHoYo. No official comment was made on the rewards, leading to review-bombing by fans; the game's Google Play score dropped from 4.5 to 1.9. miHoYo's other games, Honkai Impact 3rd and Tears of Themis were also review-bombed. In response, miHoYo formally apologized to players and made paid upcoming anniversary rewards free as a time-restricted login gift. 

On August 24, 2022, the game released the 3.0 version, introducing the Sumeru region. However, Sumeru's characters are thought to be "clearly inspired by cultures of Southwest Asia, North Africa and South Asia", but most of them are white-skinned, prompting accusations of whitewashing and colorism; the English voice actor of an introduced character, Anjali Kunapaneni, received harassment and criticism on Twitter.

The mask of the character Xiao was called "satanic" by parents after it appeared in a middle school mural.

In February 2023, allegations of abusive behavior and sexual exploitation of minors were made against the English voice actor of the character Tighnari, Elliot Gindi. Gindi apologized for some of his actions but denied the allegations of preying on minors. He was widely condemned by the Genshin Impact community and fellow voice actors, with the voice director of the game, Chris Faiella, seeking to take action against Gindi. Hoyoverse later announced on Twitter that Gindi would no longer be voicing Tighnari due to a "breach of contract", and confirmed the character's eventual recasting with a new voice actor to be revealed at a later date.

Security concerns 
The game has been criticized for initially lacking security features ubiquitous on other sites, like two-factor authentication. On October 19, 2020, a vulnerable security flaw was discovered that exposed the phone number linked to a player's account during the password recovery attempt on the miHoYo website. However, the issue was not rectified until November 9, 2020. miHoYo has issued notices following the wake of security exposures, informing players to be careful about sharing account details and to bind their account to their email address and phone number. In May 2021, two-factor authentication was added whenever the player signs in on a new device.

Similar to other online games, the game uses an anti-cheat system implemented by a kernel driver. The driver is used to prevent other programs from performing code injection, memory inspection, and other process manipulation. Originally, the anti-cheat driver would remain loaded after the game exited.  This issue was rectified shortly after the game's release, and now unloads as soon as the game exits.

Reception 

Genshin Impact received "generally favorable reviews" according to review aggregator Metacritic. The open world of Teyvat drew praise; IGN Travis Northup described Teyvat as "a world that is absolutely bursting at the seams with possibilities", and Hardcore Gamer Jordan Helm described it as "one big environmental puzzle". Liyue in particular was picked out by Kotaku Sisi Jiang for being "one of the most exciting regions that I've visited in a video game in years", before continuing on to discuss how the region "shows an idealized portrayal of Chinese social relations that exists in localized pockets". Game Informer characterized the game as an incredible experience, noting that "[t]he gameplay loop of collection, upgrading, and customization is captivating and compelling". The execution of gameplay impressed Pocket Gamer, and Destructoid Chris Carter called the combat system "one of the most interesting things" about the game. NPR remarked that the game had an abundance of content despite being free to play. Gene Park of The Washington Post lauded the game as revolutionary for the genre, having players "imagine a mobile gaming world with titles with quality that matches the industry's top-tier experiences". Polygon also praised the game for differentiating itself from its peers, heralding its arrival as mobile games become more mainstream and appealing to "an audience outside the typical mobile gaming demographic" and "new players without the hardware to play more conventional and resource-hogging RPGs".

Most of the criticisms about Genshin Impact come from the endgame aspects of the game, Kotaku noting that although the game provides a solid experience it also has "some of the typical bullshit that comes along with a zero-dollar price tag". GameSpot echoed this criticism, noting that the game is "hampered a bit by the restrictions its free-to-play model imposes". PC Gamer said that playing the endgame becomes "a slog", and that the resin system "feels so unnecessary". Warning players about how predatory the monetization is, The Washington Post added that such a well-designed game from an aesthetic standpoint can lead some to gamble with the game's gacha system.

When the Genius Invokation TCG minigame launched, it received positive comments from critics. CBR compared the game with Hearthstone and Gwent: The Witcher Card Game, and believed that it could expand the game's audience. Siliconera critic Stephanie Liu said that the minigame rekindled her excitement in the early days of the game. Gamersky editor Youming Xingkong said that the Genius Invokation TCG is an attempt to keep players fresh in Genshin Impact and solve the burnout that will occur in long-term operation games. The Youxiputao editor also pointed out that Genius Invokation TCG can "make up for the shortcomings of the game's long-term experience" and "strengthen the relationship between players". Prior to launch, fans had already made a Genius Invokation TCG mod on Tabletop Simulator.

Accolades
Apple awarded Genshin Impact with "iPhone Game of the Year" in the App Store Best of 2020. The game also won Google Play's "Best Game of 2020".

Commercial performance
On mobile platforms, Genshin Impact saw 23 million downloads and grossed approximately  within a week after its release. Its strong performance continued through October 2020 as the game was the highest-grossing game worldwide during that month. Its largest revenue came from China, Japan, South Korea, and the United States, with 69 percent of mobile revenue coming from outside China itself during this time period specifically. In the United States, its release was the largest launch of a role-playing game on mobile in history.

On mobile platforms, Genshin Impact had grossed over $393 million within two months after release and over $1 billion by the end of March 2021, the third highest revenue from a mobile game during that time frame after Honor of Kings and PUBG Mobile, making it one of the highest grossing mobile games of all time and the fastest game to reach that milestone on Google Play and the App Store. By October 2021, the game had grossed $2 billion. It became the world's third highest-grossing mobile game of 2021, with  grossed that year. By December 2021, the game had grossed  on iOS and Android devices worldwide. The game's largest mobile market is China with 30% of revenue, followed by Japan with 23% and then the United States with 20% of revenue.

The mobile version grossed a further  between January and March 2022, adding up to more than  grossed .

Explanatory notes

References

External links

 (in Chinese)
 (in English)
 (English channel)
Genshin Impact on YouTube (English channel)

Genshin Impact
2020 video games
Action role-playing video games
Adventure games
Android (operating system) games
Cooperative video games
Fantasy video games
Free-to-play video games
Gacha games
Game Developers Choice Award winners
Golden Joystick Award winners
IOS games
MiHoYo games
Nintendo Switch games
Open-world video games
PlayStation 4 games
PlayStation 5 games
The Game Awards winners
Video game controversies
Video games containing battle passes
Video games developed in China
Video games featuring protagonists of selectable gender
Video games with cel-shaded animation
Video games with cross-platform play
Windows games